Otok Virje  is a village in Croatia, located in the municipality of Cestica near Virje Križovljansko. It is connected by the D2 highway.

References

Populated places in Varaždin County